Root rot is a condition in which anoxic conditions in the soil or potting media around the roots of a plant cause them to rot. This occurs due to excessive standing water around the roots. It is found in both indoor and outdoor plants, although it is more common in indoor plants due to overwatering, heavy potting media, or containers with poor drainage. The leaves of plants experiencing root rot often yellow and die, and if allowed to continue, the condition can be fatal.

To avoid root rot, it is best to only water plants when the soil becomes dry, and to put the plant in a well-drained pot. Using a dense potting media such as one dug up from outdoors can also cause root rot. Plants from different environments have different tolerances for soil moisture: plants evolved for desert conditions will experience root rot at lower moisture levels than plants evolved for tropical conditions. In both indoor and outdoor plants, it can be lethal and there is no effective treatment, though some plants can be propagated so they will not be lost completely. 

Many cases of root rot are caused by members of the water mold genus Phytophthora; perhaps the most aggressive is P. cinnamomi. Spores from root rot causing agents do contaminate other plants, but the rot cannot take hold unless there is adequate moisture. Spores are not only airborne, but are also carried by insects and other arthropods in the soil.
It can be controlled by drenching carbendazim.

Hydroponics
Root rot can occur in hydroponic applications, if the water is not properly aerated. This is usually accomplished by use of an air pump, air stones, air diffusers and by adjustment of the frequency and length of watering cycles where applicable. Hydroponic air pumps function in much the same way as aquarium pumps, which are used for the same purpose. Root rot and other problems associated with poor water aeration were principal reasons for the development of aeroponics.

Particular diseases
 Armillaria causes Armillaria root rot or white rot root disease
 Rhododendron root rot
 Shoestring root rot
 Texas root rot
 Rosellinia necatrix aka Dematophora necatrix
 Scytinostroma galactinum aka Corticium galactinum
 Phytophthora – see Phytophthora cinnamomi for discussion on treatment

See also 
 Pythium
 Rhizoctonia
 Plant pathology
 Damping off – root rot in seedlings

References

 Shurtleff, Malcolm C. (1962) How to Control Plant Diseases in Home and Garden Iowa State University Press, Ames, Iowa, p. 73;
 Yepsen, Roger B. Jr. (1976) Organic plant protection: a comprehensive reference on controlling insects and diseases in the garden, orchard and yard without using chemicals Rodale Press, Emmaus, PA, pp. 194, 208, 212–213, 226, 247, 260, 295, 321, 333, 337, 469, 488, 577, and 629, ;
 Ellis, Barbara W. and Bradley, Fern Marshall (eds.) (1992) The Organic gardener's handbook of natural insect and disease control: a complete problem-solving guide to keeping your garden & yard healthy without chemicals Rodale Press, Emmaus, PA, p. 401, ;

Plant pathogens and diseases